Iminoaspartic acid (also known as iminosuccinate or iminoaspartate) is a dicarboxylic acid in the biosynthesis of nicotinic acid. It is synthesised by the oxidation of aspartate and is condensed by quinolinate synthase with glycerone phosphate to form quinolinic acid.

References

Dicarboxylic acids
Imines